The Piper PA-32R is a six-seat, high-performance, single engined, all-metal, fixed-wing aircraft produced by Piper Aircraft of Vero Beach, Florida. The design began life as the Piper Lance, a retractable-gear version of the Piper Cherokee Six. Later models became known by the designation Piper Saratoga. The primary difference between the Lance and early Saratoga is the development of a tapered wing on the Saratoga, replacing the "Hershey bar" wing on the Lance that was a carryover from the Cherokee Six. Later Saratoga models provided updated/improved avionics, engine and interior touches but retained the same airframe design.

Production of the Saratoga was discontinued in 2009.

The Saratoga competed for sales with the Beechcraft Bonanza, Mooney Ovation, Cirrus SR22, Cessna 210, and Cessna 350.

Development

Until 1972, when the assembly line was destroyed in a flood, the Comanche was Piper's luxury, high-performance single.  Afterwards, Piper began modifying its heavy-lifting single engined PA-32 Cherokee Six, adding retractable landing gear and designating the type as the "PA-32R".

The PA-32R was built under license by Embraer in Brazil as the Embraer EMB-721 Sertanejo.

Kits for the PA-32R-300 (six supplied), PA-32RT-300 (16) and PA-32RT-300T (two) were supplied to Chincul in Argentina for completion. They were designated the PA-A-32R and PA-A-32RT.

For the 2008 model year, the Saratoga II HP (normally aspirated) model was eliminated, along with the 6X and 6XT (fixed-gear versions of the Saratoga), leaving the turbocharged Saratoga II TC as the only production model in the PA-32 line.  Production of all PA-32 models ended in 2009.

Variants
PA-32R-300 (1976–1978)
Marketed as the Piper Cherokee Lance.  Initial version of the retractable PA-32 line, with a standard tail.

PA-32RT-300 (1978–1979)
After the first half of 1978, Piper modified the tail to a "T" design with the stabilator (horizontal stabilizer/elevator) moved to the top of the vertical tail. Many pilots and owners complained about the T-tail's lack of authority at low speeds.  Beginning with this model, the Cherokee name was officially dropped and the model was designated the Lance II.

 (1978–1979)
Also in 1978, a turbocharged version, designated the Turbo Lance II, was introduced. Fuel capacity is  usable. The aircraft was the first to feature a distinctive large oval, single air intake below the propeller hub.

PA-32R-301 (1980–2007)
The 1980 models reverted to a standard tail design, and were designated as the Saratoga SP.  In 1993, the airplane received several cosmetic and systems updates and was redesignated as the Saratoga II HP.

PA-32R-301T (1980–2009)
The 1980 turbocharged model was given the name Turbo Saratoga SP.  The name and model designation stayed the same through the 1996 model year, despite several updates to the airplane during that time.  Starting with the 1997 model year, the airplane received a new designation, the Saratoga II TC, and a new Lycoming TIO-540-AH1A engine.  Externally, the biggest difference was the new cowl, with much smaller, round air inlets.  The 1997-1998 Saratoga II TCs featured a King avionics suite, which was switched to dual Garmin GNS-430's and a GTX-320 transponder with the 1999 models.  In mid-2000 model year, the avionics were again updated, with one Garmin GNS-430 and one GNS-530 and a GTX-327 transponder as standard equipment.  Beginning in 2004, the Saratoga models were available with an Avidyne Entegra "Glass Panel" avionics system, which was replaced by the Garmin G1000 in 2007.

EMB-721C Sertanejo
License built variant of the PA-32R-300 and PA-32RT-300, 150 built.
EMB-721D Sertanejo
License built variant of the PA-32R-301, 55 built.

Accidents
Kennedy's estimated total flight experience was about 310 hours, of which 55 hours were at night. His estimated flight time in the accident airplane was about 36 hours, of which about 9.4 hours were at night.
 Michael Connell, founder of New Media Communications, Govtech, and Connell Donatelli Inc. and the primary Republican Party information technology  expert for Karl Rove, George W. Bush, and John McCain, among others, died on December 19, 2008, when the Saratoga he was flying crashed while attempting an approach for landing into Akron-Canton Airport. Connell was an instrument rated pilot with over 500 hours. According to the National Transportation Safety Board (NTSB) report on the accident, Connell flew into adverse weather conditions where icing conditions existed, after having been warned about them.
 On August 8, 2009, a Saratoga and a Eurocopter AS350 collided in midair over the Hudson River near Hoboken, New Jersey, under visual flight rules. All on board both aircraft died in the accident.

Specifications (Cherokee Lance PA-32R-300)

See also
 Piper PA-32 Cherokee Six

References

External links

Piper Aircraft
PA-32 series at Airliners.net

Low-wing aircraft
Single-engined tractor aircraft
1960s United States civil utility aircraft
PA-32R
Aircraft first flown in 1974